One Night in One City, also known as One Night in a City and One Night in the City is a stop-motion-animated feature-length black comedy horror film from the Czech Republic.  It was released theatrically in its home country on 25 January 2007 and features only incomprehensible mumblings instead of dialogue, much like the earlier animated feature Krysar.

The film was made with the help of the Czech government; it got a grant of Kc 1.875 million (~US$100,000) in 1998, the largest grant given to an animated production for that year.  It was produced by MAUR Film, which was previously responsible for two award-winning Czech feature films (also puppet-animated), Fimfárum and Fimfárum 2.  The film participated in the "Forum for European Animation Films" in March 2007. 

The DVD of the film was released on February 25, 2008.

See also
Adult animation
List of animated feature-length films
List of stop-motion films

References

External links
Official website
Pictures and press information

The film's website on the official site of the Czech Republic

2007 films
Czech animated films
2000s Czech-language films
2007 horror films
2000s stop-motion animated films
Czech Lion Awards winners (films)
2000s Czech films
Czech animated comedy films
Czech animated horror films
Czech adult animated films